Jalpaiguri Division is one of the 5 divisions in the Indian state of West Bengal. It is the northernmost division of West Bengal. It is surrounded by Nepal on the western side, Bihar on South-Western side, Bhutan on the Northern side and Bangladesh on the southern side.

Districts

It consists of 5 districts:

Demographics

Hindus forms the majority of the population while Muslims forms the largest minority group. There is a significant Christian and Buddhist population in the division. They are mainly concentrated in Kalimpong district and hill subdivisions of Darjeeling district. The  Dooars regions also has a significant tribal population.

References

Divisions of West Bengal
Northern Bengal